Ali Akbar Isfahani was a 17th-century Persian architect of the Safavid era. He is best known for the Shah Mosque commissioned by Shah Abbas and built in 1611–1631. His name appears in an inscription in the mosque above the doorway of the entrance iwan complex of the mosque.

Isfahani was born in 985 AH (1577 AD). He was a pupil of Badi' al-Zaman Yazdi, the grand architect of Shah Abbas.

References

People from Isfahan
16th-century people of Safavid Iran
Iranian architects
1570s births
Year of death missing
17th-century people of Safavid Iran
16th-century architects
17th-century architects
16th-century Iranian people
17th-century Iranian people